The discography of Do or Die contains seven studio albums, one compilation and two charting singles.

Albums

Studio albums

Compilation albums

Mixtapes
 Trunk Music Mixtape (2010)

Solo projects
Belo Zero - The Truth (2006)
A.K. & Layzie Bone - Finally (2007)
Belo Zero - I Plead the 5th (2013)

Extended plays
 Withdrawal with Twista (2015)

Singles

Guest appearances

References 

Hip hop discographies
Discographies of American artists